Pål Hausken (born 25 August 1980 in Rennesøy, Norway) is a Norwegian jazz musician (drums and percussion), most known from bands like the jazz trio In The Country where he plays together with Morten Qvenild and Roger Arntzen, but also for his collaboration with artists like Susanna Wallumrød, Bull of the Year, Zahl and Music for a While together with Tora Augestad.

Career 

Hausken was a music student at the Norwegian Academy of Music when he together with fellow students Morten Qvenild and Roger Arntzen initiated the band In The Country. Here he play a central role as drummer and with five releases this is the most productive of his projects. At the Umea Jazz Festival 2012 they received brilliant critiques and followed up with the fifth album Sunset Sunrise in 2013.

Honors 
2004: Jazzintro Newcomer Award at Moldejazz, with in the Country
2012: "Independent Music Awards" with in the Country, for their latest full length art concert film

Discography

Central projects 
In The Country
2005: This Was The Pace of My Heartbeat (Rune Grammofon)
2006: Losing Stones, Collecting Bones (Rune Grammofon)
2009: Whiteout (Rune Grammofon)
2011: Sounds And Sights (Rune Grammofon)
2013: Sunset Sunrise (ATC)

Susanna Wallumrød
2007: Sonata Mix Dwarf Cosmos (Rune Grammofon)
2008: Flower of Evil (Rune Grammofon)

Zahl
2007: Nice for a Change (Kaizerecords)

Music for a While
2007: Weill Variations (Grappa)
2012: Graces That Refrain (Grappa)

Bull of the year
2009: Four Horns (AIM Sound City)

Other projects 
Hilde Marie Kjersem TUB Quartet
2004: Red Shoes Diary (Curling Legs)

Kaada
2004: MECD (Warner Music, Norway)

Gebhardt & Mjøs
2005: Alt For Norge (Apache Records)

Christer Knutsen
2005: Would You Please Welcome (Frode Records)
2006: Grand Hotel (Frode Records)

With  Tora Augestad's Music for a While including Mathias Eick, Stian Carstensen and Martin Taxt
2007: Weill Variations (Grappa Music)
2012: Graces That Refrain (Grappa Music)
2014: Canticles of Winter (Grappa Music)

Randi Tytingvåg
2012: Grounding (Ozella Records)

Finland including with Morten Qvenild, Jo Berger Myhre, Ivar Grydeland
2015: Rainy Omen (Hubro Music)

References 

20th-century Norwegian drummers
21st-century Norwegian drummers
Norwegian jazz drummers
Male drummers
Norwegian jazz composers
Norwegian Academy of Music alumni
Musicians from Rogaland
People from Rennesøy
1980 births
Living people
20th-century drummers
Male jazz composers
20th-century Norwegian male musicians
21st-century Norwegian male musicians
In the Country members
Music for a While (band) members